Căldăruşa may refer to several villages in Romania:

 Căldăruşa, a village in Traian Commune, Brăila County
 Căldăruşa, a village in Cernăteşti Commune, Buzău County

and to:
 Căldăruşa (grape), a Romanian/Moldovan wine grape that is also known as Băbească neagră

See also 
 Căldăraru (disambiguation)
 Căldărești River (disambiguation)
 Caldera (disambiguation)